Pompano Beach is a city in Broward County, Florida, United States. It is located along the coast of the Atlantic Ocean, just north of Fort Lauderdale. The nearby Hillsboro Inlet forms part of the Atlantic Intracoastal Waterway. As of the 2020 census, the city's population was 112,046.

Pompano Beach Airpark, located within the city, is the home of the Goodyear Blimp Spirit of Innovation.

History

Its name is derived from the Florida Pompano (Trachinotus carolinus), a fish found off the Atlantic coast.

There had been scattered settlers in the area since at least the mid-1880s, but the first documented permanent residents of the Pompano area were George Butler and Frank Sheen and their families, who arrived in 1896 as railway employees. The first train arrived in the small Pompano settlement on February 22, 1896. It is said that Sheen gave the community its name after jotting down on his survey of the area the name of the fish he had for dinner. The coming of the railroad led to development farther west from the coast. In 1906, Pompano became the southernmost settlement in newly created Palm Beach County. That year, the Hillsboro Lighthouse was completed on the beach.

On July 3, 1908, a new municipality was incorporated in what was then Dade County: the Town of Pompano. John R. Mizell was elected the first mayor. In 1915, Broward County was established, with a northern boundary at the Hillsboro Canal. Thus, within eight years, Pompano had been in three counties. Pompano Beach experienced significant growth during the Florida land boom of the 1920s. In 1940, the U.S. Supreme Court disallowed forced confessions in Chambers v. Florida, a dispute stemming from a murder in Pompano Beach.

Following the population boom due to World War II, in 1947, the City of Pompano merged with the newly formed municipality on the beach and became the City of Pompano Beach. In 1950, the population of the city reached 5,682. Like most of southeast Florida, Pompano Beach experienced great growth in the late 20th century as many people moved there from northern parts of the United States. A substantial seasonal population also spends its winters in the area. The city of Pompano Beach celebrated its centennial in 2008.

Geography

A 2017 study showed 73,000 residents living within FEMA's coastal floodplain.

Pompano Beach is in northeastern Broward County along the Atlantic Ocean. The city is bounded by the following municipalities:

On its northeast:
Hillsboro Beach
Lighthouse Point

On its north:
Deerfield Beach

On its west:
Coconut Creek

On its southwest:
Margate
North Lauderdale

On its south:
Fort Lauderdale

On its southeast:
Lauderdale-by-the-Sea

Climate
Pompano Beach has a tropical monsoon climate (Am) with hot, humid summers and warm winters.

Neighborhoods
These are the neighborhoods and communities that are officially recognized by the City of Pompano Beach.

Demographics

2020 census

As of the 2020 United States census, there were 112,046 people, 44,297 households, and 23,038 families residing in the city.

2010 census

As of 2010, there were 55,885 households, of which 24.5% were vacant. As of 2000, 17.4% of households had children under the age of 18 living with them, 37.4% were married couples living together, 10.9% had a female householder with no husband present, and 47.6% were non-families. 38.6% of all households were made up of individuals, and 17.1% had someone living alone who was 65 years of age or older. The average household size was 2.13 and the average family size was 2.85.

In 2000, the city the population was spread out, with 17.7% under the age of 18, 7.4% from 18 to 24, 29.1% from 25 to 44, 22.5% from 45 to 64, and 23.4% who were 65 years of age or older. The median age was 42 years. For every 100 females, there were 97.3 males. For every 100 females age 18 and over, there were 96.2 males.

In 2000, the median income for a household in the city was $36,073, and the median income for a family was $44,195. Males had a median income of $31,162 versus $26,870 for females. The per capita income for the city was $23,938. About 13.1% of families and 17.0% of the population were below the poverty line, including 30.1% of those under age 18 and 9.4% of those age 65 or over.

As of 2010, Italian-Americans made up 8.5% of the population, forming the second largest ancestry group in the city.

As of 2010, before annexation of other areas, Pompano Beach has the highest concentration of residents of Haitian ancestry in the country, at 9.3% of the population. while it had the highest percentage of Brazilians in the US, at 2.67%,

As of 2000, before many of the unincorporated areas were annexed to the city, those who spoke only English were 76.4% of the population, while those who spoke Spanish as a mother tongue were 9.3%, while French Creole (Haitian Creole) was at 6.2%, French at 2.4%, Portuguese 1.5%, German was 1.0%, and Italian as a first language made up 0.9% of the population.

Data for previously unincorporated areas that are now part of Pompano Beach:
Pompano Beach Highlands as English being at 69.54% who spoke it as a first language, while Spanish at 20.26%, French Creole (Haitian Creole) at 4.74%, Portuguese 3.89%, and Vietnamese at 1.12% of the population.
Collier Manor-Cresthaven had speakers of English as their first language at 72.54%, Spanish at 16.92%, French Creole (Haitian Creole) 6.88%, French at 1.40%, Italian at 1.12%, and Portuguese at 1.12% of residents.
Leisureville: As of 2000, speakers of English as a first language accounted for 86.24% of all residents, while speakers of French Creole accounted for 10.05%, and speakers of German as a mother tongue made up 3.70% of the population.

Education
Although there are about 17 postsecondary schools within  of downtown Pompano Beach, the majority of these are for-profit schools or schools that specialize in a specific field. Students may prefer postsecondary schools that offer programs in a wider variety of disciplines, especially if a student has yet to settle on a specific field of study. Pompano Beach is also the registered office for Augustine Graduate School, a post-secondary school, named for the North African theologian, philosopher, educator, and scholar Augustine, the graduate school offers graduate programs in the areas of psychology, philosophy, theology, education, and business; additionally the graduate school offers graduate certificates in various areas.

Broward County Public Schools operates public K–12 schools.

Elementary schools
 Pompano Beach Elementary School
 C. Robert Markham Elementary
 Cresthaven Elementary
 Cypress Elementary
 Drew Charles Elementary
 McNab Elementary
 Norcrest Elementary
 Palmview Elementary
 Sanders Park Elementary

Middle schools
 Pompano Beach Middle School
 Crystal Lake Middle School

High schools
 Blanche Ely High School
 Pompano Beach High School (magnet for northern Broward County)
 Schools outside of the Pompano Beach city limits: Coconut Creek HS (Coconut Creek) Deerfield Beach HS (Deerfield Beach), and Monarch HS (Coconut Creek)

The Roman Catholic Archdiocese of Miami operates the Saint Coleman K–8 school in Pompano Beach; it opened on September 9, 1958. The archdiocese formerly operated the St. Elizabeth of Hungary School. The church attempted to resolve its debt to the archdiocese by loaning $2.13 million from Bank of America, and the school had $337,000 in debt in 2009, and it ballooned to $1.3 million of debt in the 2009–2010 school year. It closed on June 15, 2010.

Economy
In recent years, an effort to rejuvenate rundown areas near the city's beach has gained momentum and has stimulated a multibillion-dollar building boom. Community redevelopment agencies were established for the East Atlantic/Beach corridor, as well as for the old downtown and Hammondville/Martin Luther King Jr. corridor.

Companies based in Pompano Beach include Associated Grocers of Florida. Nonprofits include Cross International.

Largest employers
According to the city's 2011 Comprehensive Annual Financial Report, the largest employers in the city are:

Arts and culture

Annual cultural events
Pompano Beach holds several annual cultural events including the Pompano Beach Seafood Festival, St. Patrick's Irish Festival, St. Coleman's Italian Festival, the Pompano Beach Holiday Boat Parade, The Holiday Yuletide Parade, The Annual Nautical Flea Market at Pompano Community Park & Amphitheater, and The Annual Blues and Sweet Potato Pie "Juneteenth" Festival.

Museums and other points of interest
The Kester Cottages (the Pompano Beach Historical Museum), Blanche Ely House Museum, Meridian Gallery, The Historic Ali Cultural Arts Center, Bailey Contemporary Arts, and Pompano Beach Art Gallery are located in the city. Two theatres in the area include Curtain Call Playhouse and Poet Productions. There are two malls in Pompano Beach. The first is Festival Flea Market Mall, which houses booths and kiosks selling jewelry, electronics, and clothing. The other, Pompano Citi Centre, is an open-air mall.

The city has been twinned since 2017 with Termoli, a coastal town in the province of Campobasso, Italy.

Sports
Pompano Beach Municipal Golf Course has two 18-hole courses, the Palms, and the Pines, which opened in 2013.

Parks and recreation
Parks include Pompano Beach Community Park, Kester Park, Cresthaven Park, Harbors Edge Park, and Scott Meyers Memorial Park. Fern Forest Nature Center is just across the Coconut Creek city boundary.

Pompano Beach Community Park features an aquatic center, pickleball courts, basketball courts, soccer fields, jogging paths, and baseball fields.  Prior to 2008, this park was the location of the Pompano Beach Municipal Stadium, which served as the spring training camp for the Washington Senators from 1961 to 1971 and the Texas Rangers from 1972 through 1986.

Government
In 2004, John Rayson became the first elected mayor of Pompano Beach. Prior mayors had been selected by city commissioners from among themselves. The vice-mayor continues to be selected by city commissioners from among themselves. At the federal level, Pompano Beach is located in Florida's 20th congressional district, which is represented by Democrat Sheila Cherfilus-McCormick. The current Mayor at Large is Rex Hardin.

Media
Pompano Beach is a part of the Miami–Fort Lauderdale–Hollywood media market, which is the twelfth-largest radio market and the seventeenth-largest television market in the United States. Its primary daily newspapers are the South Florida Sun-Sentinel and The Miami Herald, and their Spanish-language counterparts El Sentinel and El Nuevo Herald. Local Pompano-based media includes The Pompano Pelican, the longtime local weekly newspaper; the Deerfield-Pompano Beach Forum, published by the Sun-Sentinel Company; Pompano Post Community Newspaper and PompanoFun.com, a website focusing on local entertainment and events; and television program Today in Pompano.

Infrastructure

Transportation
The South Florida Regional Transportation Authority has its headquarters in Pompano Beach, located next to the Pompano Beach Tri-Rail station.

In addition to Tri-Rail, Pompano Beach is also served by several bus routes operated by Broward County Transit. Two major transfer points are the Northeast Transit Center and Pompano Citi Centre.

Notable people

 Jahseh Onfroy (1998–2018), better known as XXXTentacion, rapper who died June 18, 2018, in Deerfield Beach, Florida
 Kodak Black (born 1997), rapper
 Roland "Bad Bad Leroy Brown" Daniels (1950–1988), professional wrestler
 Tyrone Carter (born 1976), professional football player, Pittsburgh Steelers
 Henri Crockett (born 1974), professional football player, Atlanta Falcons
 Zack Crockett (born 1972), professional football player, Oakland Raiders
 Blanche General Ely and Joseph A. Ely (1903–1994), school founders and principals; see Ely Educational Museum
 Further Seems Forever, emo band
 Mark Gilbert (born 1956), Major League Baseball player, and US Ambassador to New Zealand
 Al Goldstein (1936–2013), pornographer and former publisher of Screw magazine
 Kelsey Grammer (born 1955), actor in the NBC sitcoms Cheers and Frasier
 Paolo Gregoletto (born 1985), bass player in metal band Trivium
 Al Harris (born 1974), professional football player, Green Bay Packers
 Lamar Jackson (born 1997), Heisman winner, NFL MVP, football quarterback for the Baltimore Ravens
 Ingemar Johansson (1932–2009), former world heavyweight boxing champion
 Eddie Jones (born 1971), professional basketball player, Dallas Mavericks
 Barry Krauss (born 1957), professional football player, Miami Dolphins
 Jerome McDougle (born 1978), professional football player, Philadelphia Eagles
 Stockar McDougle (born 1977), professional football player Jacksonville Jaguars
 Harry Newman (1909–2000), All-Pro football quarterback
 Richard Thomas Nolan (born 1937), writer, Episcopal Church canon, retired philosophy and religion professor
 Dan Nugent (1953–2001), professional football player, Washington Redskins
 Patrick Peterson (born 1990), professional football player, Arizona Cardinals
 Jason Pierre-Paul (born 1989), professional football player, New York Giants
 Jabari Price (born 1992), professional football player, Minnesota Vikings
 Jordan Pundik (born 1972), vocalist in pop-punk band New Found Glory
 Jake "The Snake" Roberts (born 1955), professional wrestler, retired WWE
 Rashard Robinson (born 1995), professional football player, New York Jets
 Esther Rolle (1920–1988), actress, from television's Good Times and Maude
 Clint Session (born 1984), professional football player, Indianapolis Colts
 Corey Simon (1977), professional football player, Indianapolis Colts
 Harold Solomon (born 1952), American tennis player ranked No. 5 in the world in 1980
 Brett Swenson (born 1988), professional football player, Indianapolis Colts
 Natalie Vértiz (born 1991), Peruvian American beauty pageant titleholder who represented Peru at Miss Universe 2011
 Fahreta Živojinović (born 1960), better known as Lepa Brana, Bosniak and Yugoslavian pop-folk singer

Sister cities
Pompano Beach's sister cities are:
 Itajaí, Brazil
 San Clemente del Tuyú, Argentina
 Termoli, Italy

See also

 Merritt Boat & Engine Works
 Kester Cottages

References

Further reading

External links
 
 City of Pompano Beach official site
 Pompano Beach Chamber of Commerce
 Pompano Beach Historical Society
 City-Data.com—Comprehensive Statistical Data and more about Pompano Beach

 
Beaches of Broward County, Florida
Cities in Broward County, Florida
Cities in Florida
Italian-American culture in Florida
Populated coastal places in Florida on the Atlantic Ocean
Seaside resorts in Florida
Beaches of Florida
1908 establishments in Florida